Ashiakwei Aryee (born 2 January 1976) is a Ghanaian boxer. He competed in the men's light middleweight event at the 1996 Summer Olympics.

References

External links
 
 

1976 births
Living people
Ghanaian male boxers
Olympic boxers of Ghana
Boxers at the 1996 Summer Olympics
Place of birth missing (living people)
Light-middleweight boxers
Welterweight boxers